Lithocarpus mariae is a tree in the beech family Fagaceae. It is named for the Dutch botanical biographer Maria Johanna van Steenis-Kruseman.

Description
The greyish bark is smooth and lenticellate. The flowers are solitary along the rachis.

Distribution and habitat
Lithocarpus mariae is endemic to Borneo. Its habitat is mixed dipterocarp forest to  altitude.

References

mariae
Endemic flora of Borneo
Plants described in 1970
Flora of the Borneo lowland rain forests
Flora of the Borneo montane rain forests